The 2015 National Football League known for sponsorship reasons as the Allianz National Football League was the 84th staging of the National Football League (NFL), an annual Gaelic football tournament for the Gaelic Athletic Association county teams of Ireland. The League began on Saturday 31 January 2015. Thirty-one Gaelic football county teams from the island of Ireland, plus London, participated. TG4 and Setanta provided live coverage of the league with highlights shown on RTÉ2 on Sunday nights.

Dublin won their third title in a row and twelfth in total after a 1–21 to 2–07 win against Cork in the final on 26 April at Croke Park.

Format

League structure
The 2015 format of the National Football League was a system of four divisions of eight teams. Each team played every other team in its division once, either home or away. 2 points were awarded for a win and 1 for a draw.

Tie-breaker
If only two teams were level on league points -
 The team that won the head-to-head match was ranked first
 If this game was a draw, score difference (total scored minus total conceded in all games) was used to rank the teams
 If score difference was identical, total scored was used to rank the teams
 If the two teams were still level, a play-off was required
If three or more teams were level on league points, points difference was used to rank the teams.

Finals, promotions and relegations
The top four teams in Division 1 contested the 2015 NFL semi-finals (first played fourth and second played third) and final. The top two teams in divisions 2, 3 and 4 were promoted, and contested the finals of their respective divisions. The bottom two teams in divisions 1, 2 and 3 were relegated.

Division 1

Table

Rounds 1 to 7

Division 1 Semi-finals

Division 1 Final

Division 2

Table

Rounds 1 to 7

Division 2 Final

Division 3

Table

Rounds 1 to 7

Division 3 Final

Division 4

Table

Rounds 1 to 7

Division 4 Final

Statistics
All scores correct as of 16 April 2016

Scoring
Widest winning margin: 17
 Sligo 2-26 – 2-09 Louth (Division 3)
Most goals in a match: 7
Louth 3-11 – 4-16 Tipperary (Division 3)
London 5-06 – 2-15 Waterford (Division 4)
Most points in a match: 36
Kildare 2-12 – 0-24 Roscommon (Division 2)
Most goals by one team in a match: 5
London 5-06 – 2-15 Waterford (Division 4)
 Highest aggregate score: 48 points
Louth 3-11 – 4-16 Tipperary (Division 3)
Lowest aggregate score: 12 points
Dublin 0-08 – 0-04 Derry (Division 1)

Top scorers
Overall

Single game

References

 
National Football League
National Football League (Ireland) seasons